Henry de Bury or Bederic (fl. 1380), was an English monk and writer.

He was a Benedictine monk from the ancient and royal Abbey of Bury St. Edmonds.

References

A biographical, historical and chronological dictionary, John Watkins

Year of birth missing
Year of death missing
English Benedictines
English religious writers
14th-century English writers
Writers from Bury St Edmunds
English male non-fiction writers